Microbulbifer yueqingensis is a Gram-negative, aerobic bacterium found in marine sediment. Its type strain is Y226T (=CGMCC 1.10658T =JCM 17212T).

References

Further reading

Whitman, William B., et al., eds. Bergey's manual® of systematic bacteriology. Vol. 5. Springer, 2012.

External links
LPSN
Type strain of Microbulbifer yueqingensis at BacDive -  the Bacterial Diversity Metadatabase

Alteromonadales
Bacteria described in 2012